Chirayu Amin is an Indian billionaire businessman and cricket administrator. He is the chairman and managing director of Alembic Pharmaceuticals Ltd. and Alembic Group. He was the chairman of the Indian Premier League and vice president of the Board of Control for Cricket in India. He was also the chairman of the Federation of Indian Chambers of Commerce. He also served as the president of the Baroda Cricket Association. As of May 2021, Amin has a net worth of US$1.8 Billion dollars as mentioned by Forbes.

In January 2021, he was awarded the lifetime achievement award by the Federation of Gujarat Industries (FGI).

Personal life
His wife, Malika Chirayu Amin, has been named among the India's richest woman in 2020 by Kotak Wealth Hurun.

References

External links
 Alembic Pharmaceuticals Ltd
 Alembic Group

Living people
Indian Premier League
Indian cricket administrators
Businesspeople from Gujarat
Year of birth missing (living people)
Indian billionaires
Indian businesspeople
Maharaja Sayajirao University of Baroda alumni
Seton Hall University alumni